Merve Çağıran (born 13 July 1992) is a Turkish actress.

Çağıran finished high school in İzmir. She was then educated at 35,5 Art Center. In 2010, she made her television debut with a role in Tek Türkiye. After appearing in various TV series, her main breakthrough occurred in 2016 with Aşk Laftan Anlamaz In 2018, she was honored at the Golden Butterfly Awards with the Shining Star award.

Filmography

References

External links 
 
 

1992 births
Turkish television actresses
Living people
Golden Butterfly Award winners